Lamina affixa is a layer of epithelium growing on the surface of the thalamus and forming the floor of the central part of lateral ventricle, on whose medial margin is attached the choroid plexus of the lateral ventricle; it covers the superior thalamostriate vein and the superior choroid vein. The torn edge of this plexus is called the tela choroidea.

On the surface of the terminal vein is a narrow white band, named the lamina affixa.

GDF-15/MIC-1 has been observed in lamina affixa cells.

References

External links
 https://web.archive.org/web/20071024195305/http://www.univie.ac.at/anatomie2/plastinatedbrain/surfaceanatomy/surface-2-text.html

Thalamus